Florida's 1st congressional district is a congressional district in the U.S. state of Florida, covering the state's western Panhandle. It includes all of Escambia, Okaloosa, and Santa Rosa counties, and portions of Walton county. The district is anchored in Pensacola and also includes the large military bedroom communities and tourist destinations of Navarre and Fort Walton Beach and stretches along the Emerald Coast. The district is currently represented by Republican Matt Gaetz. With a Cook Partisan Voting Index rating of R+19, it is one of the most Republican districts in Florida.

Characteristics

The district encompasses the western part of the Florida Panhandle, in the extreme western portion of the state, stretching from Pensacola and the Alabama border east to include Walton, Holmes, and Washington counties.

Most of the territory now in the 1st District had been the 3rd District from 1903 to 1963; however, it has been numbered as the 1st District since then. It cast aside its Democratic roots far sooner than most of the other areas of the state. It has not supported a Democrat for president since John F. Kennedy in 1960. In 1964, Republican Barry Goldwater carried the district by such a large margin that it nearly pushed Florida's electoral votes into the Republican column. It has continued to vote for Republicans by very wide margins, with the only exception being 1976, where Gerald Ford won a narrow 50–49 victory over Jimmy Carter. Nonetheless, it usually continued to elect conservative Democrats at the state and local level, even in years when Republican presidential candidates won the district handily. Well into the 1980s, the district's congressmen and state lawmakers only faced "sacrificial lamb" Republican challengers on the occasions they faced any opposition at all. For example, Democratic incumbent Earl Hutto was unopposed for reelection in 1984 even as Ronald Reagan won the district with over 70 percent of the vote. As late as 1992, Democratic Senator Bob Graham easily carried the district with 54 percent of the vote—more than double Bill Clinton's total in the district.

This changed with the Republican Revolution of 1994. That year, Joe Scarborough became the first Republican to represent the Panhandle since Reconstruction. This change was more a result of eight-term incumbent Hutto retiring than of a Republican upsurge. It had been taken for granted that Hutto would be succeeded by a Republican once he retired, particularly after he was nearly defeated in 1990 and 1992. Republicans had also swept most of the district's overlapping state legislative seats. It is currently considered the most Republican district in Florida, and no Democratic candidate has won more than 40 percent of the vote since Hutto's retirement. John McCain received 67% of the vote in this district in 2008, and Mitt Romney and Donald Trump respectively carried it by similar margins in 2012 and 2016.

The district's conservatism is not limited to national politics. Since 1994, Republicans have dominated elections at the state and local levels. Graham is the last Democrat to have won it in a statewide race. In much of the district, there are now no elected Democrats above the county level.

The area comprising the 1st District has maintained a large military presence ever since John Quincy Adams persuaded Spain to sell Florida to the United States in 1819, in part to gain a deepwater port at Pensacola. The U.S. Air Force also has a large presence in Eglin Air Force Base, which is economically important to the district. Hurlburt Field is an auxiliary field at Eglin AFB and is the location of the Air Force Special Operations Command. Eglin AFB spreads over three counties. Pensacola Naval Air Station was the first Navy base devoted to the specific purpose of aviation, and is the home of the Blue Angels. Saufley Field, used for training, is slightly north of Pensacola NAS.

A large number of veterans who retire relocate to this district. Tourism, particularly in Navarre, Pensacola Beach, and Destin, is a major economic activity.

Voting

Voter registration

List of members representing the district

Recent election results

2001 (special)

2002

2004

2006

2008

2010

2012

2014

2016

2018

2020

2022

References

Bibliography

 Congressional Biographical Directory of the United States 1774–present

01
Navarre, Florida